Pultenaea reticulata is a species of flowering plant in the family Fabaceae and is endemic to the far south-west of Western Australia. It is an erect, open shrub with flat, elliptic leaves, and yellow-orange and reddish-brown flowers.

Description
The flowers are yellow-orange and reddish-brown and sessile with bracteoles attached to the pedicel. Flowering occurs from August to December and the fruit is a flattened pod.

Taxonomy and naming
This species was first formally described in 1808 by James Edward Smith who gave it the name Daviesia reticulata in The Cyclopedia. In 1864, George Bentham changed the name to Pultenaea reticulata in Flora Australiensis. The specific epithet (reticulata) refers to the veins in the leaves.

Distribution
This pultenaea is usually found winter-wet places in the Esperance Plains, Jarrah Forest, Swan Coastal Plain and Warren biogeographic regions of south-western Western Australia.

Conservation status
Pultenaea rdiata is classified as "not threatened" by the Government of Western Australia Department of Parks and Wildlife.

References

radiata
Eudicots of Western Australia
Plants described in 1808
Taxa named by James Edward Smith